He Bingjiao (born 21 March 1997) is a Chinese badminton player. She began to receive intensive badminton training at the Suzhou Junior Sports School, when she was 7 years old. Five years later, she was sent to study in Nanjing and for tougher training there. The junior already competed in the senior level, and made her senior international debut at the 2013 Vietnam Open. In 2014, she competed at the Summer Youth Olympics, winning a gold medal in the girls' singles and a bronze in the mixed doubles event. She also won bronze medals at the World Championships in 2018 and 2021.

Career

2013–2015 
He Bingjiao started playing at international tournaments in 2013 when she was 16 years of age. She reached the semi-finals of the Asian Junior Championships where she was defeated by the Thai Busanan Ongbamrungphan in straight games. She also reached the semi-finals of the World Junior Championships but was defeated by the Japanese Aya Ohori. She won the Vietnam Open by defeating the Indonesian Hera Desi in straight games by just 21 minutes.

At the 2014 World Junior Championships, she avenged her defeat to Aya Ohori in the World Junior Championships last year, beating her in straight games. However she had to settle for a silver medal after she lost to another Japanese Akane Yamaguchi in a tightly contested final match of 3 games 21–14, 18–21, 13–21. Her biggest victory came at the Youth Olympic Games, where she defeated Akane Yamaguchi in yet another difficult match and took revenge of her defeat in World Junior Championships final. She also had a good campaign at the Bitburger Open, where she defeated prominent opponents like Michelle Li and Beiwen Zhang, but finished as runner-up after her defeat against Sun Yu.

In 2015, she won her first title of the year at the China Masters, defeating Hui Xirui. She also got a final spot in the New Zealand Open, but was defeated by Japanese player Saena Kawakami. She suffered a shocking defeat in the quarter-finals of the World Junior Championships by Natsuki Nidaira of Japan. She claimed the Indonesian Masters title later that year, defeating Chen Yufei in straight games in the final. Her victories in the tournament included a biggest surprise against two-time World Championship bronze medalist P. V. Sindhu.

2016 
She had one of the greatest tournaments of her career at the Swiss Open, where she defeated world's top players: Ratchanok Intanon, P. V. Sindhu, and Sun Yu to reach the finals. She defeated Wang Yihan in a one-sided final match, 21–16, 21–10, and took revenge of her defeat in the All England against her. She claimed her first Superseries title at the Japan Open, beating Sun Yu in the final. She won the French Open Superseries thereafter, defeating Beiwen Zhang in a very easy final 21–9, 21–9. She defended her title successfully at the Bitburger Open, beating Nitchaon Jindapol in the final. As a result of her outstanding performances, she was qualified for the season-ending Superseries Finals, where she had satisfactory results. Despite losing to Tai Tzu-ying and Sung Ji-hyun, she won against Ratchanok Intanon after Intanon left the match trailing 19–21, 11–10.

2017 
She reached the semi-finals of the Asian Championships after a hard battle against Olympic silver medalist P. V. Sindhu in the quarter-finals. However, she lost in the semi-finals against Akane Yamaguchi in straight games, thus winning the bronze medal. She was also the part of the China's Sudirman Cup team that won the silver medal at that tournament after losing to South Korea in the final. At the World Championships in Glasgow, Scotland, she lost to home favorite Kirsty Gilmour in the third round in a thrilling match, 14–21, 21–15, 16–21. She failed to defend her title in Japan after losing to Carolina Marín in the final. She was qualified for the Dubai World Superseries Finals this time too, but lost all the group matches, losing to P. V. Sindhu, Akane Yamaguchi and Sayaka Sato. Therefore, she was denied a semi-final spot.

2018 
She reached the final of the Malaysia Open for the first time, but failed to give good fight to Tai Tzu-ying even after she had three game points in the first game. She took her biggest revenge against Tai Tzu-ying in the World Championships, where she defeated her in the quarter-finals in 3 games 21–18, 7–21, 21–13. With this win, she broke Tai Tzu-ying's nearly seven months' unbeatable record which included 31 straight wins. She had to settle for a bronze medal after getting defeated by Carolina Marín in yet another three-game clash, 21–13, 16–21, 13–21.

She competed at the Asian Games, where she lost to Nozomi Okuhara in the round of 16. She had shown her great consistency after reaching the semi-finals of various other tournaments. Although she was qualified, she opted not to take part in the first ever edition of World Tour Finals in her home country China, citing some injury problems she got during her match against Sung Ji-hyun in the Hong Kong Open.

2019 
At the India Open, she defeated the defending champion Beiwen Zhang in the quarter-finals and P. V. Sindhu for the fourth straight time in the next round. but lost in the final to Ratchanok Intanon in straight games. This was her first defeat against Intanon. She won a silver medal at the Asian Championships following her defeat against Akane Yamaguchi again. After early losses in Indonesia, Japan and Thailand, she finished as a quarter-finalist in the World Championships losing out to Nozomi Okuhara. She got a title victory in Korea Open in 3 years after her last in 2016. In the final, she defeated Ratchanok Intanon even when she was 4 match points down. She had an upsetting campaign at the World Tour Finals, where she was defeated by Akane Yamaguchi, Chen Yufei and P. V. Sindhu. She led against Sindhu in game one with a huge 18–9 lead, but failed to consolidate that lead, and eventually lost the match 19–21, 19–21.

2020–2021 
He Bingjiao competed at the 2020 Summer Olympics as the number eight seed in the women's singles. She finished fourth after being defeated by Chen Yufei in the semi-finals and P. V. Sindhu in the bronze medal match. She was part of the China's winning team at the 2021 Sudirman Cup. She reached the semi-finals of the 2021 World Championships. However, she lost to Tai Tzu-ying in three games 17–21, 21–13, 14–21, so she settled for a bronze medal, her second ever medal at the World Championships.

2022 
She started the 2022 season by winning the German Open and the Korea Masters, defeating compatriot Chen Yufei in both finals. Then in October, she claimed back-to-back Super 750 titles, winning the Denmark Open and the French Open. As a result of her good performance this season, she qualified for the World Tour Finals, where she topped the group by beating Tai Tzu-ying, Ratchanok Intanon and Busanan Ongbamrungphan to reach the semi-finals for the first time in her career. However, she was outpowered by Tai Tzu-ying in straight games. Despite this, she still reached a career-high ranking of No.5 at the end of the year.

Achievements

BWF World Championships 
Women's singles

Asian Championships 
Women's singles

Youth Olympic Games 
Girls' singles

Mixed doubles

BWF World Junior Championships 
Girls' singles

Asian Junior Championships 
Girls' singles

BWF World Tour (5 titles, 2 runners-up) 
The BWF World Tour, which was announced on 19 March 2017 and implemented in 2018, is a series of elite badminton tournaments sanctioned by the Badminton World Federation (BWF). The BWF World Tour is divided into levels of World Tour Finals, Super 1000, Super 750, Super 500, Super 300 (part of the HSBC World Tour), and the BWF Tour Super 100.

Women's singles

BWF Superseries (2 titles, 1 runner-up) 
The BWF Superseries, which was launched on 14 December 2006 and implemented in 2007, was a series of elite badminton tournaments, sanctioned by the Badminton World Federation (BWF). BWF Superseries levels were Superseries and Superseries Premier. A season of Superseries consisted of twelve tournaments around the world that had been introduced since 2011. Successful players were invited to the Superseries Finals, which were held at the end of each year.

Women's singles

  BWF Superseries Finals tournament
  BWF Superseries Premier tournament
  BWF Superseries tournament

BWF Grand Prix (5 titles, 2 runners-up) 
The BWF Grand Prix had two levels, the Grand Prix and Grand Prix Gold. It was a series of badminton tournaments sanctioned by the Badminton World Federation (BWF) and played between 2007 and 2017.

Women's singles

  BWF Grand Prix Gold tournament
  BWF Grand Prix tournament

Record against selected opponents 
Record against year-end Finals finalists, World Championships semi-finalists, and Olympic quarter-finalists. Accurate as of 21 January 2023.

References

External links 
 

1997 births
Living people
People from Lianyungang
Badminton players from Jiangsu
Chinese female badminton players
Badminton players at the 2014 Summer Youth Olympics
Youth Olympic gold medalists for China
Badminton players at the 2020 Summer Olympics
Olympic badminton players of China
Badminton players at the 2018 Asian Games
Asian Games silver medalists for China
Asian Games medalists in badminton
Medalists at the 2018 Asian Games
20th-century Chinese women
21st-century Chinese women